Beardstown is an unincorporated community located entirely within the city limits of Lobelville, Tennessee.

History
Beardstown was formerly host to an elementary school, post office, and a store. The school was closed in 1988 with the consolidation of public schools in Perry County.

In 1864, a skirmish known as the Battle of Beardstown was fought partly in an area currently occupied by a golf course in Beardstown between Confederate and Union forces during the American Civil War.

References

Unincorporated communities in Tennessee